Cavendish is a lunar impact crater that is located in the southwest part of the Moon, to the southwest of the larger crater Mersenius. It lies between the smaller craters Henry to the west-northwest and de Gasparis to the east-southeast.

The rim of Cavendish is heavily worn and the crater Cavendish E lies across the southwest rim. The smaller Cavendish A is intruding into the northeast rim. On the flood are a pair of low-rimmed craters that are joined at the rims and span most of the central Cavendish crater floor from east to west.

A rille from the Rimae de Gasparis reaches the eastern rim of Cavendish.

Satellite craters
By convention these features are identified on lunar maps by placing the letter on the side of the crater midpoint that is closest to Cavendish.

References

 
 
 
 
 
 
 
 
 
 
 
 

Impact craters on the Moon